Pili Fantasy: War of Dragons is the 2019 remake of the sixth season of  Pili. The story is loosely based on the 1990 Pili season, and is considered a separate continuity from the Pili series. The show features both Hokkien and Mandarin dubs, and is a rare example of women voicing female characters in Hokkien in Taiwanese glove puppetry show. A second Hokkien dub was released on May 6, 2020. The Mandarin dub was done by TrioPen studio.

A second installment called Pili Fantasy: Doom of Dragons was released on August 19, 2020, with Hokkien dubs from the second casting.

Synopsis

The evil Dragon Spirit of the Great Underworld was defeated by Dragon God Suiku. Although the evil dragon survived in spirit form, the protection of Dragon God in the Martial World prevented him from terrorizing humans, until Mo Chi-yan of Fire Dragon's Tongue killed Suiku by accident, allowing the Dragon Spirit to summon the Eight Wonders to assist him in his revival. The evil Dragon Spirit also appeared before Kuan Tsu-tien, Golden Sun Emperor of the Northern District, instigating an invasion of the Martial World. Only the Eight Generals of Heavenly Tiger can stop the Dragon Spirit and his Wonders.

Production
The 1990 Pili season was the season in which long-time popular characters Su Huan-chen, Yeh Hsiao-chai, and Yi Ye-Shu, a.k.a. the "Three Pillars of Pili" (霹靂三台柱), were first introduced in a united front, and was considered an initiation point for first time viewers of the puppetry series.

Due to its high production cost, in contrast to the Pili series that ran continuously from 1984 to the present, the remake was released in separate installments, with the first installment War of Dragons (20 episodes) released on Jan 23, 2019, and the second part Doom of Dragons releasing its first 10 episodes after a one-year gap on August 19, 2020. The remaining episodes of Doom of Dragons are yet to be released as of April 22, 2022, with COVID-19 pandemic speculated to have played a part in its delay.

Release
Each episode of War of Dragons were pre-screened in four VIESHOW Cinemas across Taiwan 24 hours before DVDs were released on sale through convenience stores. The show was also simulcast on Pili App, CHT MOD, Taiwan Mobile myVideo, and Far EasTone friDay. War of Dragons was licensed by Netflix and released with multi-language subtitles on July 12, 2019.

Reception
War of Dragons was criticized for its chaotic pacing despite initial promotions as a newcomer friendly entry to the Pili universe. The first dubbing was especially poorly received by fans of the traditional one-person glove puppetry voice acting by Huang Wen-tse. As a result of the voice acting criticisms, a "New Dub" version was released exclusively on Pili's streaming platform and TV channel.

The second installment Doom of Dragons was much warmer received, with Taiwanese critic Vinegar Film Cafe praising the show for its more contemporary take on the Pili universe, streamlined pacing, and improved performance from the New Dub cast.

Media

Soundtrack

Pili Fantasy: War of Dragons Original Soundtrack (霹靂英雄戰紀之刀說異數 劇集原聲帶) was released on May 24, 2019. It contains a total of 40 tracks divided into two CDs, more than half of which are themes dedicated to major characters.

Manga
Three manga adaptations that expanded the stories behind War of Dragon's characters were released digitally on Dragon Youth Comic magazine by Tong Li Publishing. All three adaptations were later published in limited tankōbon format.

Pili Fantasy: Pili Devil Eyes
Following a one-shot webmanga featuring Yeh Hsiao-chai and Pan To-fei, Tong Li Publishing announced a spin-off manga adaptation based on the Pili Fantasy continuity by the one-shot artist T.K Chang Shih-Hsin. The story takes place before the events of War of Dragons, and focuses on a completely new character called Flying Snow (飛雪), whose family is wiped out by unknown assailants. In her quest for revenge, she crosses paths with various characters from War of Dragons, especially Yeh Hsiao-chai. The manga was nominated for the 11th Golden Comic Awards

Pili Fantasy: Luó Wǎng Qián Kūn
The second spin-off manga by mangaka duo Ya Shen features Chi Lu-jen's backstory. The name is based on Chi Lu-jen's title Master Illusionist.

Pili Fantasy: Huā Yǔ Hú
The third manga adaptation was announced on February 2, 2020 at Tong Li Publishing's launch event for Taiwanese original creators during Taipei International Comics & Animation Festival 2020. Drawn by the artist D2 in the yaoi style, the story retells the events of War of Dragons and Doom of Dragons from Hua Hsin-Feng and Leng Chien Pai-hu's perspectives, and is still in serialization as of April 22, 2022.

References

External links
  
 
 

Glove puppetry
Taiwanese television shows featuring puppetry
Taiwanese drama television series
Taiwanese wuxia television series
Mandarin-language television shows
Hokkien-language television shows